Veøya (or Veøy) is an island in Molde Municipality in Møre og Romsdal county, Norway. It is located at a junction of the three main branches of Romsdal Fjord between the island of Sekken and the mainland near the village of Nesjestranda.  The  island was the municipal centre of the old Veøy municipality.  The island was Norway's first legally protected land, and the buildings on the island, including the Old Veøy Church, are now part of the Romsdal Museum.

History

The island was a strategic location for the coastal routes during the Viking Age. The southern branch of Romsdal Fjord leads to the Romsdal valley (and the present-day town of Åndalsnes), where important trade routes led up the valley to Lesja. From there it followed the pilgrim trail over Dovre to Trøndelag, or down the Gudbrandsdal valley to Eastern Norway. To the west, past the inlet of the fjord, were the southbound routes to Bergen.

At this junction, Veøy was established as a kaupang (Old Norse for a market town), and Romsdal’s economic, administrative, and religious center. It had 300-500 permanent residents, and was an important commercial center, with a significant increase during the sailing season.  The Old Veøy Church, dedicated to the Apostle Peter, is built in stone and it is the only survivor of three churches on Veøya in the Middle Ages.  This church dates back to around the year 1200. It has a capacity of 400 people, and served the entire region, while the other churches served the local population.

Veøya is mentioned by Snorre Sturlason in connection with the battle of Sekken in 1162 where king Håkon Herdebrei was killed by Erling Skakke on 7 July 1162, during the Norwegian civil wars. Veøya, or nearby on the mainland, was probably the seat of Ragnvald Eysteinsson (Ragnvald Mørejarl), earl of Møre, whose son was Hrolf Ganger (Gange-Rolv).

The island became the seat for the municipality of Veøy in 1838. On 1 January 1964 the islands Sekken and Veøya as well as the Nesjestranda district on the mainland, with 756 inhabitants in total, were incorporated into the neighboring Molde Municipality. The island was Norway's first legally protected land, and the buildings on the island are now part of the Romsdal museum.

See also
List of islands of Norway

References

Islands of Møre og Romsdal
Molde